Viscount Kemsley, of Dropmore in Buckingham county, is a title in the Peerage of the United Kingdom. It was created in 1945 for the press lord Gomer Berry, 1st Baron Kemsley. He had already been created a Baronet, of Dropmore in the County of Buckingham, on 25 January 1928, and Baron Kemsley, of Farnham Royal in the County of Buckingham, in 1936, also in the Peerage of the United Kingdom. Berry was the younger brother of the industrialist Henry Berry, 1st Baron Buckland, and of fellow newspaper magnate William Berry, 1st Viscount Camrose.  the titles are held by his grandson, the third Viscount, who succeeded his uncle in 1999.

The Conservative politician the Hon. Sir Anthony Berry was the youngest son of the first Viscount Kemsley.

The family seat is Church Hill Farm, near Brockenhurst, Hampshire.

Viscounts Kemsley (1945)
(James) Gomer Berry, 1st Viscount Kemsley (1883–1968)
(Geoffrey) Lionel Berry, 2nd Viscount Kemsley (1909–1999)
Richard Gomer Berry, 3rd Viscount Kemsley (born 1951)

The heir apparent is the present holder's son, Hon. Luke Gomer Berry (born 1998).

Line of succession

  (James) Gomer Berry, 1st Viscount Kemsley (1883–1968)
  (Geoffrey) Lionel Berry, 2nd Viscount Kemsley (1909–1999)
 Major Hon. Denis Gomer Berry (1911–1983)
  Richard Gomer Berry, 3rd Viscount Kemsley (born 1951)
 (1) Hon. Luke Gomer Berry (born 1998)
 (2)  Hon. Jessamine Eleanor Berry (born 1999)
 Hon. Sir Anthony George Berry (1925–1984)
 (3) Edward Anthony Morys Berry (born 1960)
 (4) William Anthony Edward Berry (born 1993)
 (5) George Raymond Gomer Berry (born 1967)

See also
Viscount Camrose
Baron Buckland

References

Kidd, Charles, Williamson, David (editors). Debrett's Peerage and Baronetage (1990 edition). New York: St Martin's Press, 1990.

Viscountcies in the Peerage of the United Kingdom
 
Noble titles created in 1945